Below is a list of nominations and appointments to the Department of Labor by Joe Biden, the 46th president of the United States. , according to tracking by The Washington Post and Partnership for Public Service, 11 nominees have been confirmed, 2 nominees are being considered by the Senate, 3 positions do not have nominees, and 3 appointments have been made to positions that don't require Senate confirmation.

Color key 
 Denotes appointees awaiting Senate confirmation.

 Denotes appointees serving in an acting capacity.

 Denotes appointees who have left office or offices which have been disbanded.

Appointments

Withdrawn nominations

See also 
 Cabinet of Joe Biden, for the vetting process undergone by top-level roles including advice and consent by the Senate
 List of executive branch 'czars' e.g. Special Advisor to the President

Notes 

Confirmations by roll call vote

Confirmations by voice vote

References 

 Biden
Labor